Borée was a  74-gun ship of the line of the French Navy.

Design and construction 
Designed based on plans by Jacques-Noël Sané, and updated by Maillot, she and her sister (Pluton) were the prototypes of a new variant of the Téméraire class designed to have a smaller draught, allowing the production of ships of the line in the shallow harbour of Antwerp.

Borée was retro-fitted with improvements introduced on Pluton.

Career 
In May 1805, Borée was commissioned and Captain Louis-André Senez took command on 29 August. She was part of the Mediterranean squadron under Vice-Admiral Ganteaume, in Toulon.

From February to April 1808, Borée took part in Ganteaume's expedition to Corfu.

In April 1809, she took part in the escort of a convoy to Barcelona, in a division under Rear-Admiral Cosmao.

In October 1809, she resumed escort duties for a convoy to Barcelona, this time in a division under Rear-Admiral Baudin. The fleet departed Toulon on 21st, In the morning of the 23rd, the convoy was intercepted by a British squadron under Admiral Collingwood; Baudin ordered the convoy to escape to the bay of Roses, while the escort attempted to distract the British. By noon, fourteen British ships were chasing the three French ships of the line and two frigates. In the morning of 24th, the French squadron anchored close to the coast; it departed the next day at 5, and Baudin gave his captains liberty of manoeuvre to negotiate the shallow waters.

The aviso Provençale had witnessed the fight and her captain, Ensign Vallat, proposed to lead Borée into the harbour of Sète. The delicate manoeuvre succeeded, putting Borée out of reach of the British squadron. Borée and Pauline returned to Toulon, where they arrived on 19 November.

In 1811, Borée remained in Toulon with the Mediterranean squadron, under Senez. On 18 November 1812, Captain Jean-Michel Mahé took command of Borée, part of the squadron commanded by Vice-Admiral Émeriau. He captained Borée during the action of 5 November 1813 and until her decommissioning on 13 June 1814.

Borée remained decommissioned in Toulon until 1828, when she was struck and broken up.

Notes and references

References

Bibliography 
 
 
 Fonds Marine. Campagnes (opérations ; divisions et stations navales ; missions diverses). Inventaire de la sous-série Marine BB4. Tome deuxième : BB4 1 à 482 (1790-1826) 
 

Ships of the line of the French Navy
Téméraire-class ships of the line
1805 ships
Ships built in France